Dodwell is a surname. Notable people with the surname include:

 Charles Reginald Dodwell (1922–1994), English art historian
 Christina Dodwell (born 1951), explorer and travel writer
 Edward Dodwell (1767–1832), Irish writer on archaeology
 Grant Dodwell (born 1952), Australian producer, actor, writer and director
 H. H. Dodwell (1879–1946), English academic in India
 Henry Dodwell (1641–1711), Irish scholar, theologian and writer
 Henry Dodwell (priest) 17th century Anglican priest in Ireland
 Henry Dodwell (religious controversialist) (1706–1784), satirist, son of Henry
 Sam Dodwell (1909–1990), English painter
 William Dodwell (1709–1785), theological writer, son of Henry

See also 
 Dodwell, hamlet in Luddington, Warwickshire, England
 Dodwell & Co., founded as Dodwell Carlill & Co in 1891. Changed name to Dodwell & Co in 1899. Acquired by Inchcape plc in 1972.

References

English-language surnames